Raja Club Athletic, commonly referred to as Raja CA, Raja Casablanca, RCA or simply RAJA  is a professional football club based in Casablanca, Morocco, that competes in Botola, the top flight of Moroccan football.

Founded on 20 March 1949 in the district of Derb Sultan, the club has traditionally worn a green home kit since inception. Raja CA is a well known club for the success of its football section, very popular in and outside the country. Raja sits at the Raja-Oasis Sports Complex for training and plays home games in the 67,000 capacity Stade Mohammed V in downtown Casablanca since 1955. Unlike most African sporting entities, Raja's members have owned and operated the club throughout its history.

The club is one of the most widely supported teams in Africa. Raja is one of two founding members of Botola that have never been relegated from the top division since its debut in 1956, along with Wydad AC. The club holds many long-standing rivalries, most notably in the Casablanca Derby with Wydad AC and the Classico with the capital side AS FAR.

Raja established itself as a major force in both Moroccan and African football during the 1990s, winning three CAF Champions League. This success was replicated in the league, which the club won seven times in ten years, including six in a row between 1995 and 2001. This team, which included some club icons such as Mustapha Moustawdaa, Mustapha Chadili, Salaheddine Bassir and Abdellatif Jrindou, is considered by some in the sport to be the greatest African team in the 90's. Club and Moroccan national team legend, Abdelmajid Dolmy holds the record for most appearances for the club.

In domestic football, the club has won 20 trophies; 12 Botola titles, 8 Moroccan Throne Cup. In international competitions, Raja have won 9 trophies; 3 CAF Champions League titles, two CAF Confederation Cup, two CAF Super Cup and 1 CAF Cup. In international football, it is the only African team, with TP Mazembe, to reach the final of the FIFA Club World Cup in 2013 when the green eagles faced Bayern Munich.

In 2000, Raja was ranked by CAF in the 3rd place of the best African clubs of the 20th century, after Al Ahly SC and Zamalek SC. Raja is also, with 18 official trophies, the most successful Moroccan club of the 21st century, and is the 4th most crowned club in Africa with 9 titles in official competitions.

History

Foundation and first steps (1949-1956)

Raja Club Athletic (abbreviated to Raja CA or RCA) was founded on 20 March 1949 by the Moroccan resistance and more particularly by the honorary president Moulay Sassi Ben Ahmed El Alaoui Aboudarka and the heads of the Moroccan unions, in particular the first president of the Moroccan Workers' Union, Mahjoub Ben Seddik, as well as the former president of the Union of Arab Lawyers and ex-prime minister Mohamed Maâti Bouabid.

Boujemaa Kadri took charge of the administrative organization, necessary for the foundation of Raja CA. Other personalities are behind the club's creation, such as Tibari, Salah Medkouri, Mustapha Chemseddine, Karim Hajjaj, Si Ahmed Skalli Haddaoui, Choukri, Daoudi, Hachmi Nejjar, Mohamed Charfaoui, Laachfoubi El Bouazzaoui, Abdelkader Jalal, Naoui, and some other Moroccan intellectuals and resistance fighters who met often at a café named Al Watan (The Country in English), owned at the time by Hmidou El Watani, in Derb Sultan.

The ban on entrusting the presidency of the club to a Moroccan is circumvented by leaving the chair for six months to Ben Abadji Hejji, a Muslim of Algerian origin who had the French nationality. The French authorities, are thus forced to accept that. After several attempts to find a name for the club, a draw between the names of Raja and Fath, allowed the name Raja, picked three consecutive times, to be chosen.

Early years (1956–1973) 

After the independence of Morocco in 1956, the Royal Moroccan Football Federation is created and therefore replaces one of the twenty-two leagues of the French Football Federation during the time of the French Protectorate which was called Ligue du Maroc de Football. In their first season, Raja successfully defeated the Sports Union of Ben Ahmed 4–1, Ennasr of Casablanca 2–0 and finally Olympique Ouezzane 7–0. They were thus the first team to enter the first division. Kacem Kacemi then retired from his coaching position for personal reasons. Raja lost their first match 2–0 in the 1956–57 Botola against Fath Union Sport, but they managed to beat SC Roches Noires in the next leg with the same score. The team finished the season in tenth, barely avoiding relegation. The following year, thanks to the arrival of Affani Mohamed Ben Lahcen known as "Père Jégo", the club finished fourth.

During the 1959–1960 season, a huge controversy broke out at the end of the season after the Moroccan federation decided to play a triangular tournament between the first three teams of the tied championship in terms of points while Raja was in the lead on goal difference. The club protested this unfair decision and refused to participate. They were demoted to third place and a play-off was played between the other two title contenders, AS FAR and KAC Kénitra. KAC won the title.

In the 1964–1965 season, the club finished twelfth and almost got relegated, but they still managed to reach the final of the Throne Cup for the first time in its history, where they faced Kawkab Marrakech on 13 June 1965 at the Stade Mohammed V. KACM won the match 3–1. It was the third consecutive coronation of the Merrakchis in the competition, and the first defeat in the final for Raja. During this season, the Green Eagles defeated Wydad in the quarterfinals with a score of two to one. The team finished the 1966–1967 season in third place in the championship with 65 points. Houmane Jarir finished as the top scorer with 18 goals.

On 14 July 1968, the final of the Throne Cup took place, between Raja and Racing de Casablanca. RAC won the title for the first time in its history and the Eagles, still unable to claim their first title, lost 1–0.

Three cups in a decade (1973–1982)

The 1974 Throne Cup final opposed the semi-final winners, Raja who beat Wydad AC on penalties, against the Maghreb de Fès. During a match played in the Stade Mohammed V on 28 July 1974, Raja led by coach Mohammed Tibari, wins the cup against MAS thanks to the goal of El Arabi 1–0. The Green Eagles won this competition for the first time and also won the first title in their history.

On 17 July 1977, Raja CA moved to Rabat to face Difaâ Hassani El Jadidi at the Stade du FUS on behalf of the Throne Cup final. The Greens won the match 1–0 on a penalty from Abdellatif Beggar and therefore won the competition for the second time.

On 14 March 1982 at the Stade Roches Noires in Casablanca, the final of the Throne Cup was played between Raja and the KAC Kénitra. In 1977,Raja won its third title in the competition after a goal by Abdellatif Beggar. This season will also witness the first appearance of Raja on the African scene, more precisely in the 1983 African Cup Winners' Cup, unexperienced Raja was eliminated in the first round.

First titles in Africa and Morocco (1982–1995)

In 1982–1983, reached the final of the Throne Cup for the second time in a row, this time against the Olympique de Casablanca. The final took place on 21 August 1983 at the Stade Mohamed V, Raja loses the title this time on penalties (4–5), after the match ended in a draw 1–1. Raja finished second in the 1985–1986 championship, behind his rival Wydad AC, who edged him 2 points on the last day. Furthermore, he was eliminated in the cup by the future champion, AS Far in the round of 16 2–0.

In the 1987–1988 season, then coached by the Portuguese Fernando Cabrita, Raja defeated US Sidi Kacem 1–0 on the penultimate day thanks to the goal of Abderrahim Hamraoui. The Greens finally manage to win their first championship title after 39 years. Following this, Raja participates in the 1989 African Cup of Clubs, the Eagles of Rabah Saâdane wrap up this edition by winning in the final against the Algerian side of MC Oran on penalties after a cumulative score of 1–1. Raja succeeds in winning this competition from its first participation.

In the 1991–92 season, Raja reached the 1991–92 Throne Cup final to face Olympique de Casa again. The match took place on 11 January 1993 at the El Harti Stadium in Marrakech and Olympique managed to beat Raja another time in the final with a score of 1–0.

Supremacy (1995–2006)

On 18 February 1996, in the quarterfinals of the 1995–96 Throne Cup, Raja recorded the highest score in the history of Derby and overpowered Wydad (5–1). He then eliminated Rachad Bernoussi in the semi-finals (3–0) before defeating ASFAR in the final with a goal scored by Jrindou in the 119th minute. Two months later, Green Eagles won their first domestic double and the third of Moroccan football history.

On 16 September 1996, Raja lost the final of the 1996 Arab Club Champions Cup, against Al Ahly SC with a score of 3–1. On 15 June 1997, Raja, secured their second Botola title in a row with 2 matches to go, 2 points ahead of their rival. On 14 December 1997, and after losing the first leg against Ashanti Gold S.C. (1–0), the Green Eagles won their second Champions League title, on penalties after winning the match (1–0). On 15 March 1998 at Stade Mohammed V, Raja lost the African Super Cup to Étoile du Sahel on penalties after 2-2 a draw.

On 3 May, Raja defeated Hassania Agadir and won the Championship with a record of 67 points and one loss conceded, an all-time record also. On 8 November, the Greens Eagles were eliminated from the semi-finals of the 1998 Champions League. On 25 April 1999 at Stade Mohamed V, the Green Eagles won the Afro-Asian Cup against South Korean side Pohang Steelers. On 29 June 1999, under the direction of Oscar Fulloné, Raja defeated JS Massira (2–1) and won his 4th League title in a row. In the second leg of the 1999 Champions League final, and after a draw at Stade Père Jégo (0–0), Fulloné's men face Espérance Sportive de Tunis at Stade El Menzah. The match stayed goalless 0–0. Then came the penalty shootout, and the success of Mustapha Chadili who stopped the last penalty and offered the title to his team.

Raja qualified for the 2000 FIFA Club World Cup. Raja is eliminated from the first round after three defeats against S.C Corinthians 0–2, Al Nassr FC (3–4, goals by Nejjary, Bouchaib El Moubarki and El Karkouri) and Real Madrid (2–3, goals by Achami and Moustawdaa). On 5 March 2000, in a full and enthousiastic Stade Mohammed V, Raja beat the Ivorian side Africa Sports thanks to the goals of Bouchaib El Moubarki and Mohamed Armoumen 2–0 and won its first CAF Super Cup. On 21 June, after their victory against JS Massira 4–1, the Eagles set a new record and won their 5th championship in a row with 59 points, ahead of Wydad and Maghreb de Fès.

On 20 May 2001, Silvester Takač won Raja their 6th consecutive championship with a total of 64 points. On 17 November 2002, in a memorable match, the Green Devils overcomes a 2–0 first-leg deficit by beating ASEC Abidjan in the semi-finals at Mohamed V. Raja thus enters its 4th Champions League final to face Zamalek SC. After a draw (0–0) in Casablanca, Walter Meeuws' men were defeated in Cairo 0–1. On 9 November 2003 at Stade Roumdé Adjia, Henri Michel's men won the CAF Cup against the Cameroonian side of Cotonsport (0–0), after their 2–0 first leg victory.

On 11 January 2004, Raja won the Throne Cup for the 5th time in its history by beating MAS of Fez with the score of 2–0. On 20 June, Raja was crowned champion of Morocco for the 8th time in its history. On 16 July 2005 at the Moulay Abdallah stadium, Raja won the 6th throne cup, beating Olympique Khouribga on penalties (5–4) in the final after a 0–0 draw. Raja won the 2006 Arab Champions League by beating ENPPI Club in the final with respective scores of 2–1 and 1–0.

Ups and downs (2006–2012)
In 2008–2009, the club parted ways with Chay and replaced him with Portuguese José Romão, who helped Raja win the title after 5 years. In the summer of 2010, the return of ex-president Abdesalam Hanat was highly greeted by supporters and, after a mass signing of players, Raja were crowned Champions of Morocco with 7 points ahead of their runner-up. This was their 10th league title.After a large wave of protests, President Abdesalam Hanat resigns from his post and a general assembly is scheduled for June 2012. Mohamed Boudrika was then elected president, and former player and coach of the team, Mohamed Fakhir returned, promising a renewal in both at the administrative and sporting levels with the signing of many players.

Boudrika era (2012–2016)

The club began their pre-season preparation in Tunisia and then returned to Morocco to face Athletic Bilbao where 60,000 supporters were eager to see the new face of their team. Raja beat the finalists of the Europa League and Copa del Rey 3–1 with goals from Mouhcine Moutouali, Adil Karrouchy and Mouhcine Iajour, then lost 8–0 in Tangier against FC Barcelona. It was the biggest defeat in the history of the team.

On 18 November at the Moulay Abdellah stadium, Raja won their 7th Throne Cup against AS FAR following a penalty shootout. On 3 April 2013, the Green Eagles were eliminated from the semi-finals of the Arab Cup against Al-Arabi SC by conceding a draw at Stade Al Abdi 2–2 despite having led the score thanks to a brace from Mouhcine Moutouali. The first leg in Kuwait ended in a 1–1 draw.

On 25 May, after an epic match against Difaâ Hassani El Jadidi, Raja became champions of Morocco for the 11th time, after dominating the championship all season, and breaking the record for goals scored (56 goals). On 18 November, Raja reached the Throne Cup final for the second consecutive time, but lost the title on penalties against DHJ. Adding this to the bad results in the league and a few days before the World Cup, the club decided to dismiss Mohamed Fakhir, and appointed Tunisian Faouzi Benzarti in his place.

From 11 to 21 December 2013, Raja participated in the 2013 FIFA Club World Cup. The Green Eagless eliminated Auckland City (2–1), C.F. Monterrey (2–1) and Atlético Mineiro (3–1) to get to the final, a stage never reached by an Arab or a North African team. The team lost 2–0 in the final against Bayern Munich but came out proud with the applause of the supporters and the international press which praised this achievement. Raja is then greeted upon his arrival in Casablanca by King Mohammed VI who pays tribute to them during a ceremony at the royal palace where he decorated the entire team. It became one of the greatest achievements in the history of African and Arab football.

In the 2013–2014, after a poor first leg which ended with the departure of Mohamed Fakhir, Faouzi Benzarti relaunched the green machine and Raja garnered 35 points out of a possible 45, scored 30 goals and only conceded 6. During the penultimate matchday in a packed Mohammed V stadium, the Green Eagles played the title-deciding match against their direct rivals Moghreb Tétouan and won 5–0 and moved on to face Olympic Club de Safi. But to everyone's surprise, Raja lost both the game and the title. Nonetheless, the team managed to win the 2015 UNAF Club Cup in this critical period after beating Club Africain 2–0.

Hard times and redemption (2016–2022)
After the departure of Mohamed Boudrika at the end of the 2015–2016 season, the new president Said Hasbane declared that Raja suffers from a financial crisis, so they must find solutions by bringing in new sponsors. On 10 August, the Raja thanked Rachid Taoussi for his services and appointed Mohamed Fakhir as coach again. In the summer of 2017, financial problems got worse and supporters demanded the departure of the president. Fakhir resigned from his job, because of the absence of the chairmen and the severe crisis that the club has encountered since the start of the season. On 20 June, Juan Carlos Garrido was named as Raja's new head coach. Despite the crisis, the Green Eagles were able to clinch their eighth Throne Cup against Difaâ El Jadida on penalties.

On 13 September 2018, Jawad Ziyat was named new president of Raja CA. In December 2018, Raja CA won the 2018 Confederation Cup against Congolese side AS Vita Club, winning the first leg 3–0 and losing 3–1 in the second in Kinshasa, thus winning this competition for the first time. It was also the club's first African title in 15 years having last won the final edition of the CAF Cup in 2003 before its merger with the Cup Winners' Cup. On 28 January, Juan Carlos was dismissed and replaced by his assistant Youssef Safri as caretaker. On 30 January, Raja announced the appointment of Patrice Carteron as new coach with a renewable contract of one year.

On 29 March, Raja won their second 2019 CAF Super Cup against Espérance Sportive de Tunis with a 2–1 scoreline in front of 25,000 spectators at the Jassim bin Hamad Stadium in Doha. On 11 November, Patrice Carteron was discharged from his function and is replaced by Jamal Sellami. On 23 November, in the return match of the round of 16 of the Arab Club Championship against Wydad, the first game of Jamal Sellami on the bench, the Greens were trailing 4–1. Immediately after, Hamid Ahaddad scored to make it 4–2. Moutouali then successfully converted a penalty "Panenka" style in the 88th minute, before Ben Malango sealed qualification with the equaliser in the 94th minute (4–4), completing a historic Remontada within the last 15 minutes. Raja thus eliminated their rivals in the first Derby played at an international competition.

In the 2019–20 CAF Champions League, Raja lost the semi-finals of the Champions League against Zamalek. Raja were thus crowned 2019–20 champions of Morocco, their first league title since 2012–13. On 11 April 2021, Jamal Sellami stepped down following the 3–0 win away to Pyramids, after the fans demanded his departure due to poor style of play and controversial team selection and tactics. He was replaced by Lassaad Chabbi.
 
In the 2020–21 CAF Confederation Cup, Raja qualified to the knockout stages after finishing top in the group stages winning six matches without conceding a single goal in the process. They faced Orlando Pirates and claimed a 5–1 victory with ease. They won Pyramids FC after a penalty-shootout in the semi-final. On July 10, Raja CA won the Confederation Cup by beating JS Kabylie 2–1, despite playing the last half hour with ten players after a booking by the ref. On August 21, the Greens won the 2019–20 Arab Club Champions Cup by defeating Ittihad FC on penalties after a thrilling final that ended in a draw (4-4, goals from Ilias Haddad, Benhalib, El Wardi and Rahimi).

On October 27, after the approval of the moral and financial reports for the 2019-2020 and 2020–2021 seasons, the general assembly appoints Anis Mahfoud as the new president of Raja Club Athletic. On December 22, Raja lost the 2021 CAF Super Cup after being defeated by Al Ahly SC in the penalties shootout. On 21 February, Marc Wilmots was released from his position as Head coach after a 1–0 victory against ES Sétif. A week later, they signed Rachid Taoussi as the new Head coach.

El Badraoui era (2022–present)
On 16 June 2022, after the resignation of Anis Mahfoud, Aziz El Badraoui was unanimously elected as new president of the club and promised a new era. 
A dozen of players left the club after the end of their contracts and more than fifteen joined it under the leadership of new coach Faouzi Benzarti.

Crest and colours

Colors and kits 

The colors of the team are green and white. The green color was chosen by the club's founders because it symbolizes hope and growth. Green is also considered the traditional color of Islam. On top of that, green is one of the colors of the Moroccan flag. White is the color of the hometown of the club, Casablanca 
These colors were used since the team's first matches in 1949.

The jersey of the Greens was long made by the German Adidas, during a period from 1968 to 1980, where he was replaced by Puma until 1995. In 1990, Raja entered into his first sponsorship deal with Chimicolor, making him the first Moroccan club to display a sponsor on his jersey. Comes after that the Moroccan bank of Africa and the East (BMAO) and ODEP 'known today as MarsaMaroc'. From 1995 to 1999, the club is sponsored by Danone and Lavazza for a year, but the club changes equipment manufacturer each season, and sees succeed successively Adidas, Uhlsport, Umbro and Adidas another time. After his victory in the 1999 CAF Champions League, Raja a contract Hummel valid until 2002, the jersey will be sponsored during this period by Western Union, Fiat, Café ASTA and Coca-Cola, In 2001, Raja signed a contract with the French sports management company Transatlas Sports Management (TSM) which has made Raja one of the first clubs in Africa to have a commission for marketing and advertising. When the Hummel contract expires, the club gives his jersey to the Italian Kappa for a period of 6 years, and also signed with Siera who remains the main sponsor until now. Then, Lotto is the equipment supplier of the club from 2008 to 2013, then Adidas takes over again until 2017. Since 2017, it is the Italian Legea. On August 13, 2021, Raja announced the signing of a four-year contract with the Italian equipment supplier Kappa.

Many football clubs around the world sport stars on their jerseys, and Raja is no exception. The jerseys of Raja have four golden stars. Each of his stars represents one of his victories in African or national competition. The first three (at the bottom of the logo) symbolize his three cups in the CAF Champions League of 1989, 1997 and 1999; the fourth (the biggest at the top of the logo) was added in 2011 following the tenth win in Botola Pro.

Mascot 
During a tough period marked by the French occupation of Morocco and by the resistance, the eagle represented for the founders the strong, prestigious and combative raptor. The animal's charisma is very representative of the history of the club, Raja was able to fly over the opponents despite the constraints. As Père Jégo wanted, the mythic figure of the history of the club, the eagle has been the club's emblem and mascot since its creation. Raja is now mainly known as Green Eagles.

Infrastructure

Mohamed V Stadium (D'honor)

Stade Mohamed V was called the Stade Marcel Cerdan in 1955 and the Stade d'honneur between 1956 and 1981. It was inaugurated on 6 March 1955 and it knew two renovations in 1981 and 2000. It is the official stadium for the Raja CA and also for Wydad.

The Stadium is part of a large sports complex in the heart of the city of Casablanca, specifically in the upscale neighbourhood of Maârif. It has a capacity of 67,000 spectators (more than 80,000 in 2000), not counting the North and South turns that have no seats, but where environments are warmer, and in 1997 it beat a record of 65,000 spectators in a match of Morocco against Ghana. The south turn or "Magana" (the clock in Moroccan dialect) ended up with the main groups of Raja CA fans. In 2007, the stadium was equipped with a semi-artificial turf which is acceptable under international standards. As well, the seats in the stands, the sanitary facilities and athletics track were all replaced.

Sports facilities of Raja CA:
 Raja-Oasis Sports Complex.
Raja CA Academy

Roches Noires Stadium

Records and statistics

Abdelmajid Dolmy holds the record for the most games played for the club standing at 550 appearances.

Raja is the first and only team in Morocco to win the league 6 times in a row, from the 1995–96 season to the 2000–01 season. Most points obtained in a single season (1997-1998) under the actual points scale (67 points). In the 1997–96 season, Raja won the league and only lost one match (a record).The team played 62 consecutive seasons in the first division of the Moroccan League, with traditional rivals Wydad AC.

Raja is the only Moroccan club to have played all the finals of all the competitions in which it participated, along with ASFAR. After winning the African Champions League for the third time in its history in 1999, it qualified for the 2000 Club World Cup in Brazil as the first Moroccan-African team to participate in the World Cup. The first and only team to win the African Champions League title from the first participation in 1989. The second African team and the first Arab to qualify for the FIFA Club World Cup final in Morocco in 2013 and faced the European champion Bayern Munich, and the match ended with the Bavarian club winning two goals without a response.

Raja CA is the only Moroccan club that ranked among the top 10 teams in the world by FIFA in the year 2000.

On 11 May, and after the victory against Mouloudia Oujda (2–1), Raja broke the national record for the most goals scored in one season, reaching 100 goals. The team also fared well in the league, finishing the league campaign in 2nd position. Raja played a total of 61 games in all competitions that season, another record for a Moroccan team. Mouhcine Iajour was the league top scorer with 19 goals.

The club recorded a flawless campaign of six wins in as many games, notably against last season's runners-up Pyramids and Zambia's Nkana whose 2–0 defeat at the hands of the Green Eagles ended their streak of invincibility at home across all African competitions going back to 1976. By doing so, Raja became only the second team to score 18 points in the group stage (alongside Étoile du Sahel) and set a new record of becoming the first team not to concede a single goal in the group stage (in the Champions League and Confederation Cup).

Support

The southern part of Complexe Mohamed V is fully occupied by supporters (ultras) of the club; it is the famous area called LMAGANA. Four sectors of this area of the stadium can be distinguished:
 The official gallery devoted in part to the leaders and members of the club.
 The Tribune side, covered with green seats and a rostrum.
 The Virage Sud, blank marked by the presence of a mythical scoreboard.
 The Bleachers, covered with green seats and free forum.

The supporters of Raja CA are distributed in 2 ultras:
 Ultras Green-Boys 05 (First Ultras in Morocco)
 Ultras Eagles 06
Ultras Derb Sultan

Raja is the 3rd most followed African clubs with over 8 million followers after Egyptian giants Zamalek and Al Ahly. It is as well the 2nd most followed African club on YouTube. Through its foundation created in 2013, Raja and its supporters carries out actions of general interest dedicated to children and young people to support them towards success, make them discover sport and its values and finally participate in the realization of their dreams by supporting d 'other associations.

Raja's supporters are pro-active in politics and are mainly known for their songs “Fbladi Delmouni” that became a trend in many countries. Many of its songs are made to fight against political parties and trade unions that are not doing their job of guiding, structuring and educating. The masses that stadiums in Morocco have become places of choice for raising slogans and participating in chants with a political edge, while making it look like part of sporting fun and rivalry between fans. They show immensive support to the Palestinian cause raising their flag in many of the matches.

Rivalries

Casablanca Derby 

The Casablanca derby is a derby between the Moroccan football clubs Raja and Wydad. Matches are played in the Stade Mohamed V, often containing a fierce and vibrant crowd and is regularly cited among the most fervent derbies in the world.

The Casablanca derby has extensive national media coverage and is a topic of debate for several days before and after the match between the fans of both clubs, whether in the streets, schools or workplace. The first match between the two rivals was in 1956 in which Raja won 1–0.

In 1978, Raja players withdrew from the match against Wydad during the second half after their goalkeeper received a red card and a penalty was awarded. In 1996, Raja won 5–1 in the quarter-finals of the 1995–96 Coupe du Trône; this score is the highest between the two rivals. The most famous match in the derby occurred 23 November 2019, that ended in a 4–4 draw mainly known to many as the ''Remontanda''

As of 3 July 2021

The Classico 

The Classico is a rivalry between Raja CA and ASFAR. The rivalry between the two clubs does not lack history, beginning in the 1960s after the Botola controversy of 1959–1960, where the Royal Moroccan Football Federation decided to take the title away from Raja, which was then tied with ASFAR and KAC in points, but exceeded them in terms of difference in goals. Since then, the rivalry has produced memorable matches, whether in Rabat or Casablanca in the coming years.

In the 1980s, both teams were at their peak where ASFAR were crowned champions of Africa in 1985 and Raja in 1989, and they could be entertained by Moroccans with high level matches.

In the 1990s, this rivalry experienced a big decline because of the crushing superiority of Raja, which widely dominated all his rivals during this period, it is in the 2000s, exactly in 2005 that the Raja-ASFAR rivalry took a new breath and regained a lot of intensity, when the ASFAR have gained the title after beating Raja at Mohammed V stadium in the last day of the Botola. This match is a turning point in the history of the rivalry where it will take on a more intense dimension, where the hooligans of both teams will also increase the aggravation of tensions between the two big clubs.

In 2013, a season similar to that of 2005, but this time it is the consecration of Raja as champion of Morocco and the cup of the throne, and ASFAR, vice champion of the two competitions, the club more dream did not win the Moroccan classic.

African rivalries 
Raja and Egypt's Zamalek are two of the most successful clubs in the CAF Champions League/African Cup competition, Raja winning three times and Zamalek winning five times. The most well known match between them is 2002 CAF Champions League Final, in which Raja lost 1–0. They met again in the 2019–20 CAF Champions League semi-final in which ended in a 4-1 aggregate loss. Raja had faced Al Ahly in many occasions, They have faced each other in the 1996 Arab Club Champions Cup Finals for the first time in which ended in a 3–1 loss. They met again in the 2021 CAF Super Cup Final, where the green eagles lost 6–5 on penalties. Raja has many rivals from Algeria and Tunisia due to the politics between them. They have met Algerian and Tunisian teams many times in finals. Raja defeated MC Oran in the 1989 CAF Champions League Final and JS Kabylie in the 2019 CAF Confederation Cup Final. They also defeated ES Tunis in the 1999 CAF Champions League Final and in the 2019 CAF Super Cup, and lost the 1998 CAF Super Cup to ES Sahel.

Popular culture 
Raja was featured in Ted Lasso, an American sports comedy-drama television series.

Honours

This is a list of honours for the senior Raja CA team 

 Friendly

Players

Current squad

Notable players
This list includes players that have appeared in at least 100 league games and/or have reached international status.

Personnel

Board of Directors

Source:

Current technical staff

Presidents

Managers

Sponsors

 1XBET
 MARSA MAROC
 NOR 'DAR
 SOFAC
 ATLANTA
 SANAD ASSURAUNCE
 ANP ( National ports agency )
 ONE ALL SPORTS
 Faali Lilomrane

References

External links

 Raja Casablanca relishing underdog run to Club World Cup final – Sports Illustrated, 20 December 2013

 
Football clubs in Morocco
Football clubs in Casablanca
CAF Champions League winning clubs
CAF Cup winning clubs
CAF Confederation Cup winning clubs
CAF Super Cup winning clubs
Association football clubs established in 1949
Multi-sport clubs in Morocco
1949 establishments in Morocco
Sports clubs in Morocco